The Persian Gulf, sometimes called the , is a mediterranean sea in Western Asia. The body of water is an extension of the Indian Ocean located between Iran and the Arabian Peninsula. It is connected to the Gulf of Oman in the east by the Strait of Hormuz. The Shatt al-Arab river delta forms the northwest shoreline.

The Persian Gulf has many fishing grounds, extensive reefs (mostly rocky, but also coral), and abundant pearl oysters, however its ecology has been damaged by industrialization and oil spills.

The Persian Gulf is in the Persian Gulf Basin, which is of Cenozoic origin and related to the subduction of the Arabian Plate under the Zagros Mountains. The current flooding of the basin started 15,000 years ago due to rising sea levels of the Holocene glacial retreat.

Geography

The International Hydrographic Organization defines the Persian Gulf's southern limit as "The Northwestern limit of Gulf of Oman". This limit is defined as "A line joining Ràs Limah (25°57'N) on the coast of Arabia and Ràs al Kuh (25°48'N) on the coast of Iran (Persia)".

In Iran, this is called "Arvand Rood", where "Rood" means "river".

Countries with a coastline on the Persian Gulf are (clockwise, from north): Iran; Oman's Musandam exclave; the United Arab Emirates; Saudi Arabia; Qatar, on a peninsula off the Saudi coast; Bahrain, an island nation; Kuwait; and Iraq in the northwest. Various small islands also lie within the Persian Gulf, some of which are the subject of territorial disputes between the states in the region.

Exclusive economic zone
Exclusive economic zones in the Persian Gulf:

Coastlines
Countries by coastline length:

Islands 

The Persian Gulf is home to many islands such as Bahrain, an Arab state. Geographically, the biggest island in the Persian Gulf is Qeshm island, belonging to Iran and located in the Strait of Hormuz. Other significant islands in the Persian Gulf include Greater Tunb, Lesser Tunb and Kish administered by Iran, Bubiyan administered by Kuwait, Tarout administered by Saudi Arabia, and Dalma administered by UAE. In recent years, there has also been the addition of artificial islands for tourist attractions, such as The World Islands in Dubai and The Pearl-Qatar in Doha. Persian Gulf islands are often also historically significant, having been used in the past by colonial powers such as the Portuguese and the British in their trade or as acquisitions for their empires.

Oceanography 
The Persian Gulf is connected to the Indian Ocean through the Strait of Hormuz. This difference is supplied by currents at the Strait of Hormuz. The water from the Persian Gulf has a higher salinity, and therefore exits from the bottom of the Strait, while ocean water with less salinity flows in through the top. Another study revealed the following numbers for water exchanges for the Persian Gulf: evaporation = –/year, precipitation = /year, inflow from the Strait = /year, outflow from the Strait = -/year, and the balance is 0 m (0 ft)/year.

Name

Before being given its present name, the Persian Gulf was called many different names. In Babylonian texts, it was known as "the sea above Akkad." The Assyrians called it the "Bitter Sea".
In 550 BC, the Achaemenid Empire established the first ancient empire in Persis (Pars, or modern Fars), in the southwestern region of the Iranian plateau. Consequently, in the Greek sources, the body of water that bordered this province came to be known as the "Persian Gulf". In the book of Nearchus known as Indikê (300 BC), the word "Persikon kolpos" is mentioned for multiple times meaning "Persian gulf".

During the years 550 to 330 BC, coinciding with the sovereignty of the Achaemenid Persian Empire over the Middle East area, especially the whole part of the Persian Gulf and some parts of the Arabian Peninsula, the name of "Persian (Pars) Sea" is widely found in the compiled written texts.

At the same period, there is the inscription and engraving of Darius the Great, which belongs to the fifth century BC:  King Darius says:

Considering the historical background of the name Persian Gulf, Arnold Wilson mentions in a book published in 1928 that "no water channel has been so significant as the Persian Gulf to the geologists, archaeologists, geographers, merchants, politicians, excursionists, and scholars whether in past or in present. This water channel which separates the Iran Plateau from the Arabia Plate, has enjoyed an Iranian Identity since at least 2200 years ago."

Among historians, travellers and geographers of the Islamic era, many of them writing in Arabic  from the 9th to the 17th century, Ibn Khordadbeh, Ibn al-Faqih, Ibn Rustah, Sohrab, Ramhormozi, Abu Ishaq Ibrahim ibn Muhammad al-Farisi al Istakhri, Abu al-Hasan Ali ibn al-Husayn ibn Ali al-Mas'udi, Al-Mutahhar ibn Tahir al-Maqdisi (d. 966), Ibn Hawqal, Al-Muqaddasi, Ibn Khaldun, Mohammad ibn Najub Bekiran, Abu Rayhan Biruni, Muhammad al-Idrisi, Yaqut al-Hamawi, Zakariya al-Qazwini, Abu'l-Fida, Al-Dimashqi, Hamdollah Mostowfi, Ibn al-Wardi, Al-Nuwayri, Ibn Batutta, Katip Çelebi and other  sources have used the terms "Bahr-i-Fars", "Daryaye-i-Fars", "Khalij al-'Ajami" and "Khalij-i Fars" (all of which translate into "Persian Gulf" or "Persian Sea").

Naming dispute

The body of water is historically and internationally known as the Persian Gulf. Arab governments refer to it as the Arabian Gulf or The Gulf, and other countries and organizations have begun using Arabian Gulf. The name Gulf of Iran (Persian Gulf) is used by the International Hydrographic Organization.

The dispute in naming has become especially prevalent since the 1960s. Rivalry between Iran and some Arab states, along with the emergence of pan-Arabism and Arab nationalism, has seen the name "Arabian Gulf" become predominant in most Arab countries. Names beyond these two have also been applied to or proposed for this body of water.

History

Ancient history

Earliest evidence of human presence on Persian Gulf islands dates back to Middle Paleolithic and consist of stone tools discovered at Qeshm Island. The world's oldest known civilization (Sumer) developed along the Persian Gulf and southern Mesopotamia. The shallow basin that now underlies the Persian Gulf was an extensive region of river valley and wetlands during the transition between the end of the Last Glacial Maximum and the start of the Holocene, which, according to University of Birmingham archaeologist Jeffrey Rose, served as an environmental refuge for early humans during periodic hyperarid climate oscillations, laying the foundations for the legend of Dilmun.

The oldest evidence in the world for seagoing vessels has been found at H3 in Kuwait, dating to the mid-sixth millennium BC, when the Gulf was part of an extensive trade network that involved the Ubaid settlements in Mesopotamia and communities along the entire Gulf coast.

For most of the early history of the settlements in the Persian Gulf, the southern shores were ruled by a series of nomadic tribes. During the end of the fourth millennium BC, the southern part of the Persian Gulf was dominated by the Dilmun civilization. For a long time the most important settlement on the southern coast of the Persian Gulf was Gerrha. In the second century the Lakhum tribe, who lived in what is now Yemen, migrated north and founded the Lakhmid Kingdom along the southern coast. Occasional ancient battles took place along the Persian Gulf coastlines, between the Sassanid Persian empire and the Lakhmid Kingdom, the most prominent of which was the invasion led by Shapur II against the Lakhmids, leading to Lakhmids' defeat, and advancement into Arabia, along the southern shore lines. During the seventh century the Sassanid Persian empire conquered the whole of the Persian Gulf, including southern and northern shores.

Between 625 BC and 226 AD, the northern side was dominated by a succession of Persian empires including the Median, Achaemenid, Seleucid and Parthian empires. Under the leadership of the Achaemenid king Darius the Great (Darius I), Persian ships found their way to the Persian Gulf. Persian naval forces laid the foundation for a strong Persian maritime presence in Persian Gulf, that started with Darius I and existed until the arrival of the British East India Company, and the Royal Navy by mid-19th century AD. Persians were not only stationed on islands of the Persian Gulf, but also had ships often of 100 to 200 capacity patrolling empire's various rivers including Shatt-al-Arab, Tigris, and the Nile in the west, as well as Sind waterway, in India.

The Achaemenid high naval command had established major naval bases located along Shatt al-Arab river, Bahrain, Oman, and Yemen. The Persian fleet would soon not only be used for peacekeeping purposes along the Shatt al-Arab but would also open the door to trade with India via Persian Gulf.

Following the fall of Achaemenid Empire, and after the fall of the Parthian Empire, the Sassanid Empire ruled the northern half and at times the southern half of the Persian Gulf. The Persian Gulf, along with the Silk Road, were important trade routes in the Sassanid Empire. Many of the trading ports of the Persian empires were located in or around Persian Gulf. Siraf, an ancient Sassanid port that was located on the northern shore of the Persian gulf, located in what is now the Iranian province of Bushehr, is an example of such commercial port. Siraf, was also significant in that it had a flourishing commercial trade with China by the fourth century, having first established connection with the far east in 185 AD.

Colonial era

Portuguese influence in the Persian Gulf lasted for 250 years; however, since the beginning of the 16th century, Portuguese dominance contended with the local powers and the Ottoman Empire. Following the arrival of the English and the Dutch, the Safavid Empire allied with the newcomers to contest Portuguese dominance of the seas in the 17th century.

Portuguese expansion into the Indian Ocean in the early 16th century following Vasco da Gama's voyages of exploration saw them battle the Ottomans up the coast of the Persian Gulf. In 1521, a Portuguese force led by commander Antonio Correia invaded Bahrain to take control of the wealth created by its pearl industry. On April 29, 1602, Shāh Abbās, the Persian emperor of the Safavid Persian Empire, expelled the Portuguese from Bahrain, and that date is commemorated as National Persian Gulf day in Iran. With the support of the British fleet, in 1622 'Abbās took the island of Hormuz from the Portuguese; much of the trade was diverted to the town of Bandar 'Abbās, which he had taken from the Portuguese in 1615 and had named after himself. The Persian Gulf was therefore opened to a flourishing commerce with the Portuguese, Dutch, French, Spanish and the British merchants, who were granted particular privileges. The Ottoman Empire reasserted itself into Eastern Arabia in 1871. Under military and political pressure from the governor of the Ottoman Vilayet of Baghdad, Midhat Pasha, the ruling Al Thani tribe submitted peacefully to Ottoman rule. The Ottomans were forced to withdraw from the area with the start of World War I and the need for troops in various other frontiers. In World War II, the Western Allies used Iran as a conduit to transport military and industrial supply to the USSR, through a pathway known historically as the "Persian Corridor". Britain utilized the Persian Gulf as the entry point for the supply chain in order to make use of the Trans-Iranian Railway. The Persian Gulf therefore became a critical maritime path through which the Allies transported equipment to Soviet Union against the Nazi invasion. The piracy in the Persian Gulf was prevalent until the 19th century. Many of the most notable historical instances of piracy were perpetrated by the Al Qasimi tribe. This led to the British mounting the Persian Gulf campaign of 1819. The campaign led to the signing of the General Maritime Treaty of 1820 between the British and the Sheikhs of what was then known as the 'Pirate Coast'.
From 1763 until 1971, the British Empire maintained varying degrees of political control over some of the Persian Gulf states, including the United Arab Emirates (originally called the Trucial States) and at various times Bahrain, Kuwait, Oman, and Qatar through the British Residency of the Persian Gulf.

Modern history

The Persian Gulf was a battlefield of the 1980–1988 Iran–Iraq War, in which each side attacked the other's oil tankers. It is the namesake of the 1991 Gulf War, the largely air- and land-based conflict that followed Iraq's invasion of Kuwait. The United States' role in the Persian Gulf grew in the second half of the Twentieth Century. On July 3, 1988, Iran Air Flight 655 was shot down by the U.S. military (which had mistaken the Airbus A300 operating the flight for an Iranian F-14 Tomcat) while it was flying over the Persian Gulf, killing all 290 people on board. The United Kingdom maintains a profile in the region; in 2006 alone, over 1 million British nationals visited Dubai. In 2018, the UK opened a permanent military base, in the Persian Gulf, the first since it withdrew from East of Suez in 1971 and is developing a support facility in Oman.

Cities and population
Eight nations have coasts along the Persian Gulf: Bahrain, Iran, Iraq, Kuwait, Oman, Qatar, Saudi Arabia, and the United Arab Emirates. The Persian gulf's strategic location has made it an ideal place for human development over time. Today, many major cities of the Middle East are located in this region.

Wildlife

The wildlife of the Persian Gulf is diverse, and entirely unique because of the Persian Gulf's geographic distribution and its isolation from the international waters only breached by the narrow Strait of Hormuz. The Persian Gulf has hosted some of the most magnificent marine fauna and flora, some of which are near extirpation or at serious environmental risk. From corals, to dugongs, Persian Gulf is a diverse cradle for many species who depend on each other for survival. However, the Persian Gulf is not as biologically diverse as the Red Sea.

Overall, the wild life of the Persian Gulf is endangered from both global factors, and regional, local negligence. Most pollution is from ships; land generated pollution counts as the second most common source of pollution.

Aquatic mammals

Along the mediterranean regions of the Arabian Sea, including the Persian Gulf, the Red Sea, the Gulf of Kutch, the Gulf of Suez, the Gulf of Aqaba, the Gulf of Aden, and the Gulf of Oman, dolphins and finless porpoises are the most common marine mammals in the waters, while larger whales and orcas are rarer today. Historically, whales had been abundant in the Persian Gulf before commercial hunts wiped them out. Whales were reduced even further by illegal mass hunts by the Soviet Union and Japan in the 1960s and 1970s. Along with Bryde's whales, these once common residents can still can be seen in deeper marginal seas such as Gulf of Aden, Israel coasts, and in the Strait of Hormuz. Other species such as the critically endangered Arabian humpback whale, (also historically common in Gulf of Aden and increasingly sighted in the Red Sea since 2006, including in the Gulf of Aqaba), omura's whale, minke whale, and orca also swim into the Persian Gulf, while many other large species such as blue whale, sei, and sperm whales were once migrants into the Gulf of Oman and off the coasts in deeper waters, and still migrate into the Red Sea, but mainly in deeper waters of outer seas. In 2017, waters of the Persian Gulf along Abu Dhabi were revealed to hold the world's largest population of Indo-Pacific humpbacked dolphins.

One of the more unusual marine mammals living in the Persian Gulf is the dugong (Dugong dugon). These gentle mammals feed on sea grass and are closer relatives of certain land mammals than are dolphins and whales. Their simple grass diet is negatively affected by new developments along the Persian Gulf coastline, particularly the construction of artificial islands by Arab states and pollution from oil spills caused during the "Persian Gulf war" and various other natural and artificial causes. Uncontrolled hunting has also had a negative impact on the survival of dugongs. After Australian waters, which are estimated to contain some 80,000 dugong inhabitants, the waters off Qatar, Bahrain, UAE, and Saudi Arabia make the Persian Gulf the second most important habitat for the species, hosting some 7,500 remaining dugongs. However, the current number of dugongs is dwindling and it is not clear how many are currently alive or what their reproductive trend is. Unfortunately, ambitious and uncalculated construction schemes, political unrest, ever-present international conflict, the most lucrative world supply of oil, and the lack of cooperation between Arab states and Iran, have had a negative impact on the survival of many marine species, including dugongs.

Birds
The Persian Gulf is also home to many migratory and local birds. There is great variation in color, size, and type of the bird species that call the Persian Gulf home. Concerns regarding the endangerment of the kalbaensis subspecies of the collared kingfishers were raised by conservationists over real estate development by the United Arab Emirates and Oman. Such real estate expansion could prove devastating to this subspecies. A UN plan to protect the mangroves as a biological reserve was ignored by the emirate of Sharjah, which allowed the dredging of a channel that bisects the wetland and construction of an adjacent concrete walkway. Environmental watchdogs in Arabia are few, and those that do advocate the wildlife are often silenced or ignored by developers of real estate many of whom have governmental connections.

Real estate development in the Persian Gulf by the United Arab Emirates and Oman also raised concerns that habitats of species such as the hawksbill turtle, greater flamingo, and booted warbler may be destroyed. The dolphins that frequent the Persian Gulf in northern waters around Iran are also at risk. Recent statistics and observations show that dolphins are at danger of entrapment in purse seine fishing nets and exposure to chemical pollutants; perhaps the most alarming sign is the "mass suicides" committed by dolphins off Iran's Hormozgan province, which are not well understood, but are suspected to be linked with a deteriorating marine environment from water pollution from oil, sewage, and industrial run offs.

Fish and reefs
The Persian Gulf is home to over 700 species of fish, most of which are native. Of these 700 species, more than 80% are reef associated. These reefs are primarily rocky, but there are also a few coral reefs. Compared to the Red Sea, the coral reefs in the Persian Gulf are relatively few and far between. This is primarily connected to the influx of major rivers, especially the Shatt al-Arab (Euphrates and Tigris), which carry large amounts of sediment (most reef-building corals require strong light) and causes relatively large variations in temperature and salinity (corals in general are poorly suited to large variations). Nevertheless, coral reefs have been found along sections of coast of all countries in the Persian Gulf. Corals are vital ecosystems that support multitude of marine species, and whose health directly reflects the health of the Persian Gulf. Recent years have seen a drastic decline in the coral population in the Persian Gulf, partially owing to global warming but mostly to irresponsible dumping by Arab states like the UAE and Bahrain. Construction garbage such as tires, cement, and chemical by products have found their way to the Persian Gulf in recent years. Aside from direct damage to the coral, the construction waste creates "traps" for marine life in which they are trapped and die. The result has been a dwindling population of the coral, and as a result a decrease in number of species that rely on the corals for their survival.

Flora
A great example of this symbiosis are the mangroves in the Persian Gulf, which require tidal flow and a combination of fresh and salt water for growth, and act as nurseries for many crabs, small fish, and insects; these fish and insects are the source of food for many of the marine birds that feed on them. Mangroves are a diverse group of shrubs and trees belonging to the genus Avicennia or Rhizophora that flourish in the salt water shallows of the Persian Gulf, and are the most important habitats for small crustaceans that dwell in them. They are as crucial an indicator of biological health on the surface of the water, as the corals are to biological health of the Persian Gulf in deeper waters. Mangroves' ability to survive the salt water through intricate molecular mechanisms, their unique reproductive cycle, and their ability to grow in the most oxygen-deprived waters have allowed them extensive growth in hostile areas of the Persian Gulf. However, with the advent of artificial island development, most of their habitat is destroyed, or occupied by man-made structures. This has had a negative impact on the crustaceans that rely on the mangrove, and in turn on the species that feed on them.

Gallery

Oil and gas 

The Persian Gulf and its coastal areas are the world's largest single source of petroleum, and related industries dominate the region. Safaniya Oil Field, the world's largest offshore oilfield, is located in the Persian Gulf. Large gas finds have also been made, with Qatar and Iran sharing a giant field across the territorial median line (North Field in the Qatari sector; South Pars Field in the Iranian sector). Using this gas, Qatar has built up a substantial liquefied natural gas (LNG) and petrochemical industry.

In 2002, the Persian Gulf nations of Bahrain, Iran, Iraq, Kuwait, Qatar, Saudi Arabia, and the UAE produced about 25% of the world's oil, held nearly two-thirds of the world's crude oil reserves, and about 35% of the world's natural gas reserves. The oil-rich countries (excluding Iraq) that have a coastline on the Persian Gulf are referred to as the Persian Gulf States. Iraq's egress to the Persian gulf is narrow and easily blockaded consisting of the marshy river delta of the Shatt al-Arab, which carries the waters of the Euphrates and the Tigris rivers, where the east bank is held by Iran.

See also

 Eastern Arabia
 Eastern Arabian cuisine
 Cradle of civilization
 Deluge (prehistoric)
 Musandam Peninsula
 History of the United Arab Emirates#The pearling industry and the Portuguese empire: 16th - 18th century
 Saeed bin Butti#Perpetual Maritime Truce
 Trucial States
 Sultan bin Saqr Al Qasimi#Perpetual Maritime Truce of 1853
 Persian Gulf campaign of 1809
 Persian Gulf campaign of 1819
 General Maritime Treaty of 1820
 Geography of Iran
 Geography of Saudi Arabia
 Geography of Oman
 Geography of United Arab Emirates
 Geography of Qatar
 Geography of Bahrain
 Geography of Kuwait
 Geography of Iraq

References

External links

 Qatar Digital Library – an online portal providing access to previously undigitised British Library archive materials relating to Gulf history and Arabic science
 Persian Gulf, Encyclopædia Iranica
 The Portuguese in the Arabian peninsula and in the Persian Gulf
 32 historical map of Persian gulf, at flickr.com
 Persian Gulf from 1920
 Sharks in the Gulf
 Videos
 Documents on the Persian Gulf's name the eternal heritage ancient time by Dr.Mohammad Ajam

 
Bahrain–Saudi Arabia border
Bahrain–Qatar border
Bodies of water of Bahrain
Bodies of water of Iraq
Bodies of water of Kuwait
Geography of the Middle East
Geography of Western Asia
Seas of Asia
Seas of Iran
Bodies of water of Saudi Arabia
Bodies of water of Qatar
Iran–Iraq border
Iraq–Kuwait border
Kuwait–Saudi Arabia border
Marginal seas of the Indian Ocean
Qatar–Saudi Arabia border
Saudi Arabia–United Arab Emirates border
Western Indo-Pacific